Trethillick is a hamlet between Padstow and Crugmeer in Cornwall, England, United Kingdom.

References

Hamlets in Cornwall
Padstow